Josh Ball (born May 15, 1998) is an American football offensive tackle for the Dallas Cowboys of the National Football League (NFL). He was drafted by the Dallas Cowboys in the fourth round of the 2021 NFL Draft. He played college football at Florida State, Butler Community College, and Marshall.

Early years
Ball grew up in Fredericksburg, Virginia and played football at Stafford Senior High School. As a senior, he was a starter at left tackle, while receiving All-State and All-conference honors.

He was a four-star recruit coming out of high school and committed to Florida State University to play college football.

College career
As a redshirt freshman in 2017, he was named the starter left tackle in the fifth game against Duke University. He would remain as the starter on the left side for the last 9 contests of the season.
In 2018, he was expected to be the Seminole's starter at right tackle, however, on May 21, 2018, he was suspended by the school for one year, after being accused of dating violence against his former girlfriend. Although he was never charged, he opted to transfer to Butler Community College, where he was named the starter at left tackle. 

In 2019, he chose to transfer to Marshall University, instead of returning to Florida State University. As a junior, he was a key reserve on the team's offensive line, while playing in 13 games with one start against Western Kentucky University.

As a senior in 2020, the football season was reduced to 10 games due to the COVID-19 pandemic. He started 8 games at left tackle. He was ejected from the Conference USA Championship Game against the University of Alabama at Birmingham for incurring two personal foul penalties. He did not play in the 2020 Camellia Bowl, opting instead to start preparing for the NFL Draft. He was named first-team All-Conference USA after the season. He was forced to miss the 2021 Hula Bowl, after testing positive for SARS-CoV-2, the virus responsible for the COVID-19 pandemic.

Professional career
Ball was selected by the Dallas Cowboys in the fourth round (138th overall) of the 2021 NFL Draft. He signed his rookie contract on May 20, 2021. He was placed on injured reserve on September 2, 2021 to start the season.

References

External links
Florida State Seminoles bio
Marshall Thundering Herd bio

1998 births
Living people
American football offensive tackles
Butler Grizzlies football players
Dallas Cowboys players
Florida State Seminoles football players
Marshall Thundering Herd football players
Players of American football from Virginia
Sportspeople from Fredericksburg, Virginia